Robert Dušek, is a Czech politician. From 2009 to 2014 he served as a Member of the European Parliament, representing the Czech Republic for the Social Democratic Party

References

Living people
1967 births
MEPs for the Czech Republic 2009–2014
People from Lanškroun
Czech Social Democratic Party MEPs